Leave the World Behind is a 2020 novel by Rumaan Alam.

Plot Summary
Amanda and Clay drive out to a remote luxury Airbnb on Long Island for a vacation, along with their kids Archie, 15, and Rose, 13. They are a middle-to-upper-middle class family who live in Brooklyn. It's an idyllic and peaceful vacation until an older Black couple shows up at night, identifying themselves as the house's owners, G.H. (or George) and Ruth. They explain that there's been a blackout.

Amanda is initially suspicious of them and is surprised that they could own a home such as this one. But it turns out George and Ruth are a wealthy and highly educated couple. Their main home is in the Upper East Side of Manhattan, but they drove back to their vacation home to wait out the blackout. It's arranged that they will stay in the in-law unit in the basement until things get sorted. At the house, the wi-fi is out, along with the landline, TV and cell service. But they have power. Amanda also catches a news alert on her phone confirming a large-scale blackout across the east coast.

The next morning, Rose notices a herd of a few dozen deer outside (what she doesn't see is that there are actually thousands of them). Clay heads to town to assess the situation, but gets lost. He runs into a scared woman, but she only speaks Spanish and so he leaves her. Meanwhile, Rose and Archie go exploring in the woods. They find a shack and a house in a clearing, and Archie gets bitten by a tick. Then, a thunderous noise is heard, loud enough to crack the glass on some doors, which scares everyone. (Unknown to them, not too far away, the deer are scared and trampling everything in their wake.) Clay eventually finds his way home, but doesn't mention getting lost or the woman.

The adults try to prepare for an extended blackout, filling a tub with water in case the water stops running and checking on the food stores. But soon, Archie is sick with a fever. Amanda and Clay decide they need to leave to get him to a doctor the next morning. That night, a flock of wild flamingos appear on the lawn. Then, a few more loud noises sound out, breaking more glass and scaring them all. Amanda starts to think it would be better to stay here, where they have power, food and water, but in the morning a number of Archie's teeth have fallen out. They all also notice that Rose is missing.

Alarmed, Clay and George plan to drive immediately to a nearby hospital with Archie. Amanda will stay behind with Ruth to look for Rose. On the way, Clay finally admits to getting lost the day before, and he says that he did see a woman, but left her despite knowing she needed help.

George decides to make a stop to talk to Danny, his contractor, who he thinks can help them. However, Danny views George as merely someone he's done some work for in the past (as opposed to a friend) and greets them stiffly. He tells them what he knows, he says that there's a mass migration of deer going on which is a bad sign, and he advises that they go home and hunker down. George, Archie and Clay decide to just head back to the house. 

Elsewhere, states of emergency have been declared, and the U.S. President is stowed away in a bunker. The world is falling apart. Levees have broken, resulting in floods. Some people worry about food. In the woods, Rose has made her way to the house she'd located the day before. The occupants are not home (they are stuck in San Diego and will never see their home again). She makes note of the useful things, grabs various supplies and heads back to inform the others of her findings.

Reception

Critical reception
According to literary review aggregator Book Marks, the novel received mostly favorable reviews. Writing for The New Yorker, Hillary Kelly praised the novel as "enthralling".

Honors
It was a finalist for the 2020 National Book Award for Fiction, and was assessed by Emily Temple of Literary Hub to have been included on twenty year-end lists featuring the best novels of 2020.

Film adaptation

The novel will be adapted into a film by Netflix.

References

2020 American novels
Bangladeshi-American culture
Novels set in Long Island
American novels adapted into films
Ecco Press books